The Walking Purchase (or Walking Treaty) was a 1737 agreement between the Penn family, the original proprietors of the Province of Pennsylvania, later the Commonwealth of Pennsylvania, and the Lenape native Indians (also known as the Delaware Indians). In the purchase, the Penn family and proprietors claimed that a 1686 treaty with the Lenape ceded an area of 1,200,000 acres (4,860 km2) in northeastern Pennsylvania (that included a western land boundary extending as far west as a man could walk in a day and a half, hence its name), and forced them to vacate. The area is along the northern reaches of the Delaware River, on Pennsylvania's border with what was called, at the time, West Jersey. Encyclopædia Britannica refers to the treaty as a "land swindle". The Lenape appealed to the Iroquois Indian tribe to their north for aid on the issue, but the Iroquois refused their request, ultimately siding with the Penn interests.

A legal suit was filed almost 300-years later over the continuing dispute. In the court case Delaware Nation v. Pennsylvania (2004), the Delaware nation (one of three later federally recognized Lenape tribes) and its descendants in the 21st century claimed  of land included in the original so-called "purchase" in 1737, but the U.S. District Court granted the Commonwealth's motion to dismiss. It ruled that the case was nonjusticiable, even if the Delaware Nation's allegations of fraud were true. This ruling held through several appealed actions made through several levels of the United States courts of appeals. The Supreme Court of the United States refused to hear the case, thereby upholding the lower courts' decision.

History

The founder of the Colony, William Penn (1644–1718) in 1681, enjoyed a reputation for fair dealing with the Lenape (including the Delaware Indians). However, his heirs, John Penn ("the American") and Thomas Penn, were known for not following many of their father's moderate practices. In 1736, they claimed a deed from 1686 by which the Lenape promised to sell a tract beginning at the junction of the upper Delaware River and the tributary Lehigh River (near present day Easton, Pennsylvania) and extending as far west as a man could walk in a day and a half, later to become known as the "Walking Purchase" or the Walking Treaty of 1737. The original 17th century document might have been a verbal agreement, an unsigned treaty, an unratified treaty, or an outright forgery.  Regardless, the Penns' agents began selling land in the Lehigh Valley in the disputed area along the Lehigh River as if the treaty were in force and prior to the Lenape vacating the still inhabited area.

To allay the Lenapes' misgivings and suspicions, Penn Land Office Agent and provincial secretary James Logan (1674–1751), had a map produced that misrepresented the farther Lehigh River as the closer Tohickon Creek, and including a dotted line showing a seemingly reasonable path that the "walkers" would take. Satisfied that the land in question was not so terrible a price to honor the old deed, the Lenape signed on, making the now 1737 treaty official.

According to the popular account, Lenape leaders assumed that about 40 miles (60 km) was the longest distance that could be covered under these conditions. Provincial Secretary Logan hired the three fastest runners in the colony, Edward Marshall, Solomon Jennings, and James Yeates, to run on a prepared trail. They were supervised during the "walk" by the Sheriff of Bucks County Timothy Smith.  The walk occurred on September 19, 1737; only Marshall finished, reaching the modern vicinity of present-day Jim Thorpe, Pennsylvania, 70 miles (113 km) away.  At the end of the walk, Sheriff Smith drew a perpendicular line back toward the northeast, and claimed all the land east of these two lines ending at the Delaware River.

This resulted in an area of 1,200,932 acres (4,860 km2), only slightly smaller than the size of Rhode Island, located in the modern seven eastern Pennsylvania counties of Pike, Monroe, Carbon, Schuylkill, Northampton, Lehigh and Bucks.

The Delaware leaders appealed for assistance to the Iroquois confederacy tribe to the north, who claimed hegemony over the Delaware. The Iroquois leaders decided that it was not in their best interest to intervene on behalf of their southern neighbors, the Delaware since, James Logan had already made a deal with the Iroquois to support the colonial side.  As a result, the Lenape had to vacate the Walking Purchase lands.

Chief Lappawinsoe, Manawkyhickon, Sassoonan, Nenatcheehunt, and other Lenape leaders continued to protest the arrangement, as the Lenape were forced into the Shamokin and Wyoming River valleys, already crowded with other displaced tribes. Some Lenape later moved further west into the Ohio Country and the southern and western claims of the Kingdom of France in their territory of New France (Quebec), west of the French Fort Duquesne (later Fort Pitt and finally Pittsburgh) at the "Forks of the Ohio".  Because of the Walking Purchase, the Lenape grew to distrust the Pennsylvania government.

Delaware Nation v. Pennsylvania

District Court (2004)

In 2004, the Delaware Nation filed suit against Pennsylvania in the United States District Court for the Eastern District of Pennsylvania, seeking  included in the 1737 Walking Purchase and patented in 1741, which was known as Tatamy's Place. The court granted the Commonwealth's motion to dismiss. According to the District Court:

The District Court recounted the Delaware Nation's allegations:

The Delaware conceded that Thomas Penn had "sovereign authority," but challenged the transaction on the ground that it was fraudulent. The court held that the justness of the extinguishment of aboriginal title is nonjusticiable, including in the case of fraud. Because the extinguishment occurred prior to the passage of the first Indian Nonintercourse Act in 1790, that Act did not avail the Delaware.

Circuit Court (2006)
The United States Court of Appeals for the Third Circuit affirmed the decision of the District Court. The Third Circuit upheld that aboriginal title may validly be extinguished by fraud, and further held that the tribe had waived the issue of whether Penn was actually a sovereign purchaser. Moreover, the Circuit held that any grants to the tribe subsequent to the extinguishment could not re-establish aboriginal title. Therefore, the Circuit did not consider the merits of the tribe's argument that:

Specifically, the Circuit found it insufficient that the complaint had alleged that Penn was "accountable directly to the King of England."

The U.S. Supreme Court declined to hear the case on appeal.

See also
Phelps and Gorham Purchase

References

External links
The Walking Purchase at the Lenape Tribe official site
The Walking Purchase from the Pennsylvania Historical and Museum Commission
Photos and transcript of the original document on the Pennsylvania State Archives website

Lenape
Native American history of Pennsylvania
Political scandals in the United States
Political scandals in Pennsylvania
Former regions and territories of the United States
Pre-statehood history of Pennsylvania
1737 in Pennsylvania
Aboriginal title in the United States
1737 in law
Unratified treaties
Treaties of indigenous peoples of North America
1737 treaties